Vernon Valdez, Jr. (August 12, 1935 – June 1981) was a professional American football defensive back in the American Football League for the Buffalo Bills (1961) and the Oakland Raiders (1962,1963).  He also played in the National Football League for the Los Angeles Rams in 1960. Valdez played college football at the University of San Diego [Quarterback]. Valdez was formerly an JC All-American and played at Antelope Valley Junior College.

See also
Other American Football League players

References

1935 births
1981 deaths
Sportspeople from Los Angeles County, California
American football defensive backs
San Diego Toreros football players
Los Angeles Rams players
Buffalo Bills players
Oakland Raiders players
Players of American football from California
American Football League players